Jean-Philip Chabot (born March 31, 1988) is a Canadian professional ice hockey centre who is currently playing with the Anglet Hormadi Élite of the FFHG Division 1, the second tier level of France.

Undrafted, Chabot played major junior hockey in the Quebec Major Junior Hockey League with the Moncton Wildcats and the Gatineau Olympiques. In his successful junior career he Captained the Olympiques to the QMJHL Championships in the 2007–08 season.

He had established himself professionally playing with the Denver Cutthroats in the CHL since the 2012–13 season. Having agreed to return for a third season with the Cutthroats, on August 20, 2014, the team suspended operations, effective immediately, releasing Chabot as a free agent. On August 28, he joined his third CHL club, in agreeing to a one-year contract with the Rapid City Rush.

Career statistics

Awards and honours

References

External links

1988 births
Arizona Sundogs players
Bakersfield Condors (1998–2015) players
Charlotte Checkers (1993–2010) players
Denver Cutthroats players
French Quebecers
Gatineau Olympiques players
Ice hockey people from Quebec City
Living people
Moncton Wildcats players
Rapid City Rush players
Saint-Georges Cool FM 103.5 players
Stockton Thunder players
Canadian ice hockey centres